Stieller v Porirua City Council [1986] 1 NZLR 84 is a cited case in New Zealand regarding council liability in tort for negligent inspection.

Background
The Stiellers purchased a new house. Later, they discovered that they weatherboards were substandard, and that a stormwater drain was not connected.

Both defects had gone unnoticed by the local council building inspector.

The Stieller's sued the council for negligent building inspections.

Held
The Court of Appeal ruled that the council owed the buyers of the house a duty of care, and awarded damages against the council.

Footnote: The Court of Appeal decided Stieller v Porirua City Council on the same day as Brown v Heathcote County Council and Craig v East Coast Bays City Council which also involved negligent council building inspections.

References

Court of Appeal of New Zealand cases
New Zealand tort case law
1986 in case law
1986 in New Zealand law
Porirua